Rivulis is a global manufacturer and provider of complete micro and drip irrigation systems and solutions for seasonal horticulture, orchards, vineyards, row crops, SDI and greenhouse, soilless, hydroponic applications. Founded in 1966 as Plastro Irrigation Systems Ltd, Rivulis is headquartered in Kibbutz Gvat, Jezreel Valley, Israel. The company represents an integration of four industry pioneers and veterans: Plastro, T-Systems, Roberts Irrigation, and Eurodrip. It has 3,300 business partners worldwide, and a wholesale retail and vast dealer network in over 120 countries. The company operates 16 factories worldwide and has 2,000 employees.  Rivulis has multiple global design centers and 3 R&D centers in agricultural hotspots of Israel, California, and Greece.

History

In 2006, Plastro Irrigation (founded in 1966), Roberts Irrigation (founded in 1969), T-Systems (founded in 1977) were acquired by John Deere to form its micro and drip irrigation business, John Deere Water. In 2014, FIMI Opportunity Funds acquired John Deere Water, and changed the name to Rivulis Irrigation. In 2015, Jaya Hind Industries invested in Rivulis Irrigation and founded the joint venture in India, In 2016, Rivulis acquired Agam Advanced Agriculture and created Manna Irrigation Intelligence, its precision agriculture subsidiary. In 2017, Rivulis bought Eurodrip, a vetern micro and drip irrigation provider (founded in 1979), and become world's second largest irrigation systems manufacturer. In 2019, Rivulis and Polyplastic founded a Joint venture in Russia. In 2020, Temasek Holdings acquired a majority stake in Rivulis.

Products
Rivulis provides a full line of irrigation solutions, including drip lines, drip tapes, jets, sprinklers, online drippers, filters, valves, fertigation and control systems, and hoses and tubing. Its products are designed for above and below the ground application of water and nutrients directly to every plant's root zone. The Company offers professional system design to installation, agronomist expertise, hands-on training and education, in-the-field technical support, financing, and logistics to Manna Irrigation Intelligence, its satellite-based precise irrigation software providing growers with site specific, dynamic irrigation recommendations in real time. Additional product innovations include:
 Rivulis X-Pell, drip line & drip tape capable to defend itself against insect damage.
 Rivulis T-Tape – integrated emitter.
 Rivulis Ro-Drip – molded emitter drip lines.
 Rivulis H6000 PE Layflat – layflat with pre-installed outlets.
 Manna Irrigation Intelligence – a sensor-free precision irrigation decision support solution helping growers to fine tune their irrigation decisions in real time.

References

External links

Agriculture companies of Israel
Irrigation in Israel
Manufacturing companies of Israel
Manufacturing companies established in 1966
1966 establishments in Israel
Israeli brands